Talysh-Mughan, officially known as the Talysh-Mughan Autonomous Republic (Talysh: Толъш-Мъғонә Мохтарә Республикә, Tolış-Mığonə Muxtara Respublika), was a short-lived autonomous republic in Azerbaijan that lasted from June to August 1993.

It was located in southeastern Azerbaijan, envisaging to consist of seven administrative districts of Azerbaijan around the regional capital city Lankaran: Lankaran city, Lankaran, Lerik, Astara, Masally, Yardymli, Jalilabad, Bilasuvar. Historically, the area had been a khanate. The flag of the Talysh-Mughan Autonomous Republic and the modern Talysh flag is a vertical tricolor of red, white, and  green with a centered rising sun over blue sea.

Political turmoil

The autonomous republic was proclaimed amid political turmoil in Azerbaijan. In June 1993 a military rebellion against president Abulfaz Elchibey broke out under the leadership of Colonel Surat Huseynov. Colonel Alikram Hummatov, a close associate of Huseynov, and the leader of the Talysh nationalists, seized power in the southern part of Azerbaijan and proclaimed the new republic in Lankaran, escalating violence. However, as the situation settled and Heydar Aliyev rose to power in Azerbaijan, the Talysh-Mughan Autonomous Republic, which failed to gain any significant public support, was swiftly suppressed.

Alikram Hummatov had to flee Lankaran, when an estimated 10,000 protesters gathered outside his headquarters in the city to demand his ouster.

According to Professor Bruce Parrott,

Some observers believe that this revolt was part of a larger conspiracy to bring back to power the former president Ayaz Mütallibov.

Hummatov was arrested and initially received death sentence which was subsequently commuted to life imprisonment. In 2004, he was pardoned and released from custody under pressure from the Council of Europe. He was allowed to immigrate to Europe after making a public promise not to engage in politics. However, those who were involved in proclamation of the autonomy say they always envisaged the autonomous republic as a constituent part of Azerbaijan.

Ethnic status

According to some, the Azerbaijani government has also implemented a policy of forceful integration of some minorities, including Talysh, Tat, Kurds and Lezgins. However, according to a 2004 resolution of Council of Europe:
 

The above quote by the Council of Europe was only in reference to the improvements done by the government of Azerbaijan since 2003. The Communique, however, goes on to say: 

IFPRERLOM appealed to the Commission on Human Rights for the purpose of adopting a resolution, which urges Azerbaijan to guarantee the preservation of the cultural, religious and national identity of the Talysh people in light of repeated claims of repression.

See also

 The National Talysh Movement
 Talish-Mugan culture
 Ispahbads of Gilan
 Talysh Khanate
 Mughan Soviet Republic

References

External links

Flags of the World

History of Talysh
1993 establishments in Asia
1993 disestablishments in Asia
States and territories established in 1993
States and territories disestablished in 1993
1993 in Azerbaijan
Separatism in Azerbaijan